Edy Sixten Jernberg, known as "Sixten", (6 February 1929 – 14 July 2012) was a Swedish cross-country skier and one of the most successful cross-country skiers of all time. Between 1952 and 1964 he took part in 363 ski races, finishing within the podium in 263 and winning 134 of them; during this period he won four world titles and nine Olympic medals. In 12 starts over three consecutive Winter Games he never finished worse than fifth place, and between 1955 and 1960, he won 86 out of 161 competitions.

Jernberg was a blacksmith and a lumberjack before beginning his career as a cross-country skier. He specialized in the longer distances, with four of his eight gold medals coming over 50 km, one over 30 km and three in the 4 × 10 km relay. He also won Vasaloppet twice, 1955 and 1960. He won the 15 km at the Holmenkollen ski festival in 1954.

At one competition, Jernberg had a fever and coughed up blood, but still finished the 50 km event. Gunde Svan said: "It was almost like [Sixten] didn't like his own body and tried to punish it in different ways."

For his cross-country skiing successes, Jernberg was awarded the Holmenkollen medal in 1960 (shared with Helmut Recknagel, Sverre Stensheim and Tormod Knutsen). He was also awarded the Svenska Dagbladet Gold Medal in 1956 (shared with pentathlete Lars Hall).

Jernberg retired after the Olympic Winter Games of 1964. In 1965, the International Olympic Committee awarded Jernberg the Mohammed Taher Trophy for his contributions to Nordic skiing. He died of stroke at the age of 83. His nephew Ingemar became an Olympic pole vaulter.

Cross-country skiing results
All results are sourced from the International Ski Federation (FIS).

Olympic Games
 9 medals – (4 gold, 3 silver, 2 bronze)

World Championships
 6 medals – (4 gold, 2 bronze)

See also
List of multiple Winter Olympic medalists
List of multiple Olympic gold medalists
List of multiple Olympic medalists

References

External links
 
 
 Holmenkollen medalists – click Holmenkollmedaljen for downloadable pdf file 
 Holmenkollen winners since 1892 – click Vinnere for downloadable pdf file 

1929 births
2012 deaths
Deaths from cancer in Sweden
People from Malung-Sälen Municipality
Cross-country skiers from Dalarna County
Cross-country skiers at the 1956 Winter Olympics
Cross-country skiers at the 1960 Winter Olympics
Cross-country skiers at the 1964 Winter Olympics
Holmenkollen medalists
Holmenkollen Ski Festival winners
Olympic cross-country skiers of Sweden
Swedish male cross-country skiers
Vasaloppet winners
Olympic medalists in cross-country skiing
Olympic gold medalists for Sweden
Olympic silver medalists for Sweden
Olympic bronze medalists for Sweden
FIS Nordic World Ski Championships medalists in cross-country skiing
Medalists at the 1956 Winter Olympics
Medalists at the 1960 Winter Olympics
Medalists at the 1964 Winter Olympics
Lima IF skiers